Storfjordnytt (The Storfjord News) is a local Norwegian newspaper published once a week in Møre og Romsdal county. 

The newspaper is published every Thursday, and it covers news in the municipality of Fjord, as well as in the villages of Geiranger and Liabygda in the municipality of Stranda. The newspaper was first published as Norddal Bygdeblad on November 28, 1979, but it changed its name to Storfjord-Nytt (and then to Storfjordnytt) when its area of coverage expanded in 1989. The newspaper is edited by Randi Flø. Its offices are located in Sylte.

Circulation
According to the Norwegian Audit Bureau of Circulations and National Association of Local Newspapers, Storfjordnytt has had the following annual circulation:
2004: 1,572
2005: 1,578
2006: 1,585
2007: 1,586
2008: 1,460
2009: 1,452
2010: 1,439
2011: 1,425
2012: 1,378
2013: 1,384
2014: 1,405
2015: 1,354
2016: 1,373

References

External links
Storfjordnytt homepage

Newspapers published in Norway
Norwegian-language newspapers
Fjord (municipality)
Mass media in Møre og Romsdal
Newspapers established in 1979
1979 establishments in Norway